Manon Audinet (born 12 February 1992) is a French sailor. She and Quentin Delapierre competed for France at the 2020 Summer Olympics in the Nacra 17 event.

References

External links
 

1992 births
Living people
French female sailors (sport)
Olympic sailors of France
Sailors at the 2020 Summer Olympics – Nacra 17
Sportspeople from La Rochelle
21st-century French women